Darren Kenneth Matthews (born 10 May 1968), better known by the ring name William Regal, is an English retired professional wrestler currently signed to WWE, where he serves as the Vice President of Global Talent Development. He is also known for his tenures in World Championship Wrestling (WCW) and All Elite Wrestling (AEW) as a wrestler and manager. 

Trained by Marty Jones, Matthews started his career in 1983, at the age of 15. His first matches took place at a rare surviving wrestling carnival booth at Blackpool Pleasure Beach. He went on to wrestle for national-level promotions on the UK wrestling circuit and wrestled on television for ITV. He then progressed to touring around the world until 1993, when he was signed to World Championship Wrestling (WCW), where he took the ring name Steven Regal and became a four-time World Television Champion.

In 2000, Matthews joined the World Wrestling Federation (later World Wrestling Entertainment / WWE), where he became a two-time Intercontinental Champion, a five-time Hardcore Champion, a four-time European Champion, a four-time World Tag Team Champion, and the 2008 King of the Ring. He also had stints as the on-screen commissioner, the General Manager of the Raw brand, and the official match coordinator for the 2011 season of the  original NXT. As NXT became WWE's developmental brand the following year, he appeared as the on-screen General Manager and served as WWE's Director of Talent Development and Head of Global Recruiting from 2018 until his release in 2022. He would later sign with AEW and debut as the founder of the Blackpool Combat Club. In late 2022, Regal left AEW to return to WWE to work as the Vice President of Global Talent Development.

Early life 
Darren Kenneth Matthews was born in Codsall on 10 May 1968. He grew up admiring wrestlers Terry Rudge and Jon Cortez, whom he later called "wrestlers' wrestlers".

Professional wrestling career

Early years (1983–1992) 
After training under Marty Jones, Matthews made his debut wrestling for promoter Bobby Barron at his wrestling challenge booth at the Horseshoe Showbar at Blackpool Pleasure Beach at the age of 15. In time, he graduated to be a shooter at the booth, using brutal submission holds to defend prize money against challenges from members of the public. By this time, he wrestled professionally all over Britain for All Star Wrestling where he regularly teamed with Robbie Brookside as The Golden Boys tag team. Both Regal and Brookside appeared in several televised matches during the final years (1987–1988) of ITV's coverage of British wrestling.

Matthews went on to tour worldwide, including Germany and South Africa. In 1991, he received a tryout match with the World Wrestling Federation. Matthews relayed that through Lord Alfred Hayes, WWF had become interested in seeing the young wrestler and offered him an opportunity at the WWF UK Rampage Show on 24 April 1991. Wrestling in a dark match, he appeared as Steve Regal and teamed with Dave Taylor and Tony St. Clair to defeat Drew McDonald, Chic Cullen, & Johnny South. Later that year, he received a second booking and wrestled Brian Maxine at the Battle Royal at Albert Hall in London, England on 3 October 1991. Two months later, Matthews was again wrestling on the UK swing of a major American promotion, although this time it was World Championship Wrestling. Appearing as Steve Regal, he wrestled six matches on WCW's tour of the United Kingdom and faced Terrance Taylor, Jimmy Garvin, Giant Haystacks, and Oz (Kevin Nash).

During this early period, he was billed as Steve Regal, a name he saw in an American wrestling magazine (in use by "Mr. Electricity" Steve Regal). There were two exceptions to this. One was when he wrestled in Wales during this period, including appearances on S4C's Welsh language wrestling TV show Reslo under the name Steve Jones and was billed from Cardiff, Wales, teaming with Orig Williams and faced Fit Finlay amongst others. The other was a brief stint for Joint Promotions in 1986 where he wrestled his first two televised matches under the name Roy Regal. Otherwise, he stuck with the name Steve Regal up until shortly after his arrival in World Championship Wrestling.

World Championship Wrestling

World Television Champion (1993–1994) 
In the fall of 1992, Matthews reached out to Bill Watts on a position in World Championship Wrestling (WCW). Watts responded favourably to Regal's letter and offered him a contract. Appearing still as Steve Regal, beginning as a fan favourite character. Regal made his televised debut on 30 January 1993 episode of Saturday Night and defeated enhancement talent Bob Cook in his in-ring debut on the following week's Saturday Night. Shortly after his debut, Regal entered a tournament for the vacant WCW World Television Championship in which he defeated The Barbarian in the first round before losing to Johnny B. Badd in the quarterfinals.

He became the villain "Lord Steven Regal" on 12 June episode of Saturday Night, claiming descent from William the Conqueror and Sir William began serving as his manager. At times arrogantly charming in this persona, one of his memorable statements to a post-match interviewer was: "Do you know what my New Year's resolution is going to be? To wake up a half an hour earlier so I can hate you more". His first major win after the character change was against Marcus Alexander Bagwell on 16 June Clash of the Champions XXIII. Regal was scheduled to face Bagwell's partner 2 Cold Scorpio on 18 August Clash of the Champions XXIV, but he was replaced by Bobby Eaton. Regal himself substituted for the injured Brian Pillman to team with Steve Austin in a WCW World Tag Team Championship defence against Arn Anderson and Paul Roma; Regal and Austin lost that match.

Regal won the World Television Championship by defeating Ricky Steamboat at the inaugural Fall Brawl pay-per-view on 18 September with the help of Sir William. Regal unknowingly broke his neck during this match. Regal enjoyed a lengthy title reign as he retained the title against a flurry of challengers, beginning with his first televised title defence against Arn Anderson on 9 October episode of Saturday Night which ended in a fifteen-minute time limit draw. He then defended the title against fellow Brit Davey Boy Smith, whom he faced to a fifteen-minute time limit draw at Halloween Havoc. Regal then successfully retained the title against Johnny B. Badd on 10 November Clash of the Champions XXV and retained the title against Steamboat at Starrcade and Dustin Rhodes on 27 January 1994 Clash of the Champions XXVI, with both matches ending in time limit draws. Regal continued his successful title defences in 1994 by beating Arn Anderson at SuperBrawl IV and fighting a time limit draw against Brian Pillman at Spring Stampede. In the spring of 1994 on WorldWide, Regal challenged Ric Flair to a best-of-five series under Marquess of Queensberry Rules in which Regal lost to Flair with 1 win, 2 losses and 2 draws.

The following month, Regal lost a non-title match to Larry Zbyszko at Slamboree, leading to a title match on the 28 May episode of Saturday Night, in which he dropped the title to Zbyszko. Regal regained the title from Zbyszko on 23 June Clash of the Champions XXVII. Regal began a feud with Sting and was booked to defend the title against Sting at Bash at the Beach. However, Sting was injured prior to the event and was replaced by Johnny B. Badd, whom Regal defeated to retain the title at Bash at the Beach. Regal lost to the wrestling legend Antonio Inoki on 28 August Clash of the Champions XXVIII. In September, Regal lost the title to Badd at Fall Brawl.

The Blue Bloods (1994–1998) 

Beginning with 26 November episode of Saturday Night, Regal began scouting fellow aristocrat Jean-Paul Levesque during his matches, which lead to the duo forming a tag team on 21 January 1995 episode of Pro, when they defeated Brad and Scott Armstrong. Shortly after, Levesque left WCW and he was replaced by Alabama-born Bobby Eaton when Regal and Eaton faced each other in a match on 18 March episode of Saturday Night. Regal stopped the match and proposed that he and Eaton form a team, which Eaton accepted. Regal formed the team The Blue Bloods with Eaton and was involved in humorous vignettes where he tried to teach Eaton the finer points of dining and the proper usage of the Queen's English. The duo first began teaming on 8 April episode of WCW Saturday Night. Regal also toured WCW's working partner New Japan Pro-Wrestling (NJPW) on 16 April, where he unsuccessfully challenged Shinya Hashimoto for the IWGP Heavyweight Championship. Blue Bloods quickly entered the title picture as they initially feuded with The Nasty Boys (Brian Knobbs and Jerry Sags), their complete opposites in terms of "sophistication" and presentation. Blue Bloods unsuccessfully challenged Nasty Boys for the WCW World Tag Team Championship at The Great American Bash. On 24 June episode of WorldWide, Blue Bloods retaliated by costing Nasty Boys, the tag team titles against Harlem Heat (Booker T and Stevie Ray). Blue Bloods faced Harlem Heat and Nasty Boys for the title in a triangle match at Bash at the Beach, where they failed again. Blue Bloods soon dropped off the title picture and continued to compete as a mid-card tag team. They added "Squire" David Taylor to the team and Jeeves as their lackey by the end of the year. Eaton and Regal received a shot at the WCW World Tag Team Championship against Sting and Lex Luger on 23 January Clash of the Champions XXXII, where they failed to win the championship.

On 27 January episode of Saturday Night, Regal was attacked by the debuting Belfast Bruiser during a match, sparking a feud between the duo as the Belfast Bruiser was a Northern Irishman, who developed an on-screen hatred with Regal due to him being English. In March, Regal faced the Bruiser in a match at Uncensored, but Regal lost the match by disqualification after Eaton and Taylor attacked the Bruiser. On 29 April episode of Monday Nitro, Regal defeated the Bruiser in a Parking Lot Brawl. The duo were scheduled to team in the Lethal Lottery at Slamboree, but the Bruiser suffered an injury and was replaced by Dave Taylor. Regal and Taylor lost to Jim Duggan and VK Wallstreet. Regal challenged Sting to a match to gain some attention in the company, leading to a match between the two at The Great American Bash, which Regal lost.

On the 31 August episode of Saturday Night, Regal captured the World Television Championship for the third time by getting an upset victory over Lex Luger after Luger was attacked by The Outsiders. After winning the title, Regal solely began focusing on his title reign and the Blue Bloods became inactive. He held the title for five months and defended the title against the likes of Hacksaw Jim Duggan, Dean Malenko, former partner Bobby Eaton and Psychosis. Regal was scheduled to defend the title against Rey Misterio, Jr. at SuperBrawl VII, but he dropped the title to Prince Iaukea after a distraction by Misterio on 16 February 1997 episode of Nitro. Six days later, Regal avenged his title loss by costing Misterio, the title shot against Iaukea at SuperBrawl VII. Regal got a rematch against Iaukea for the title at Spring Stampede, which he lost. Regal attacked Iaukea on 7 April episode of Nitro, which resulted in Iaukea losing the title to Último Dragón later that night.

At Slamboree, Regal defeated Ultimo Dragon to win the belt for a fourth time, but lost the title back to Dragon two months later on 22 July episode of Nitro. Regal got another shot at the title against next champion Alex Wright on 15 September episode of Nitro, but he failed to capture the title. In the fall of 1997, Regal reformed the Blue Bloods with Dave Taylor and they unsuccessfully challenged Steiner Brothers for the WCW World Tag Team Championship at World War 3. Later that night, Regal participated in the World War 3 three-ring battle royal for a future WCW World Heavyweight Championship match.

On the 9 February 1998 episode of Nitro, Regal was pinned by Bill Goldberg in a match where Regal worked more aggressively and stiff than expected.

World Wrestling Federation (1998−1999) 
Regal's first appearance in the World Wrestling Federation was on the 29 June 1998 episode of Raw Is War in which he defeated Droz via submission with the Regal Stretch. After featuring in one more match against Tiger Ali Singh in Pennsylvania, Regal was sent to a training camp run by Dory Funk Jr. in order to get into shape. On his last day, he twisted his ankle in a match against Rhyno and upon returning home aggravated the injury falling in his bathroom, breaking his ankle and leg.

During this time, Regal was suffering from an addiction to Renewtrient, pain medication, and Valium, and was not seen on WWF television until he returned that fall as the "Real Man's Man", a builder/lumberjack-style gimmick created by Vince Russo and based on the image of The Brawny Man. Vignettes for the character showed him doing "manly" things like chopping wood, shaving with a straight razor, and squeezing his own orange juice. After he made his full-time debut in October 1998, he faced X-Pac in the opening round of the tournament for the vacant WWF Championship at Survivor Series, ending in a double countout and thus eliminating both men from the tournament. Regal then began a feud with The Godfather, but he was taken off television soon after before subsequently checking into rehab in January 1999 and was released from the company in April.

Return to WCW (1999−2000) 
After checking out of rehab, Matthews was invited back into the wrestling world, making a somewhat brief return to WCW as "Lord Steven Regal". His official pay-per-view return took place during Bash at the Beach, where he was one of many participants in the first Hardcore Invitational. The following night on Nitro, Regal, accompanied by both Fit Finlay and Dave Taylor, fought Billy Kidman. Despite outside help from Finlay and Taylor, Regal was unable to pick up the win. Two weeks later, he faced Mikey Whipwreck, but Jimmy Hart's First Family came out to challenge The Blue Bloods at Road Wild for the Hardcore Trophy, causing Regal to lose the match. Nothing came of this challenge as neither the First Family or the Blue Bloods were featured on the Road Wild card. Similar to his previous run, much of Regal's performances took place in tag team bouts. Regal continued his role as a rule breaking villain and had small feuds with teams such as The Filthy Animals. In late February 2000, Regal lost a career vs. career match against Jim Duggan on Saturday Night for the World Television Championship, which was done in order to explain Regal's release from the company.

Return to WWF/WWE

European Champion (2000–2001) 

Regal was once again hired by the WWF and sent to the developmental territory Memphis Championship Wrestling (MCW) for a short time. He re-debuted in a match with Chris Benoit at the Third Annual Brian Pillman Memorial Show.

Regal returned on the 18 September 2000 episode of Raw Is War as a heel, under the name Steven William Regal (later shortened to William Regal). Regal defeated Al Snow to win the European Championship on 16 October episode of Raw Is War. Regal would lose the title to Crash Holly at Rebellion on 2 December, before winning it back two days later on Raw Is War. Regal would enter his first Royal Rumble match at the eponymous pay-per-view on 21 January 2001, but failed to win. The next night on Raw Is War, Regal lost the European Championship to Test. On 8 March episode of SmackDown!, Regal became the new WWF commissioner, after defeating Al Snow.

Regal later became the on-screen commissioner and self-proclaimed "Goodwill Ambassador" of the WWF and was given a comedy sidekick in Tajiri. During The Invasion storyline, Regal turned face as he remained the WWF Commissioner. During the WCW/ECW Alliance storyline, Regal turned heel once again by costing Kurt Angle the WWF Championship and joining The Alliance. He was fired as commissioner by Linda McMahon, but Shane McMahon, who was the owner of WCW, hired him as the Alliance Commissioner.

After the Alliance was defeated at Survivor Series in November 2001, Regal was forced to become the first member of Vince McMahon's "Kiss My Ass" club by kissing McMahon's buttocks so he could keep his job.

The Un-Americans (2002–2003) 

Regal defeated Edge to win the Intercontinental Championship at Royal Rumble on 20 January 2002, after using a set of brass knuckles in order to knock out Edge, an action that would later become a trademark of Regal's character. Regal defended the title against Edge again at No Way Out in a brass knuckles on a pole match. He lost the title to Rob Van Dam at WrestleMania X8. The same week, he beat Diamond Dallas Page for the European Championship on 21 March episode of SmackDown!.

Regal was drafted to the Raw brand in the inaugural WWF draft lottery on 25 March. Regal lost the European Championship to Spike Dudley on 8 April episode of Raw. He regained the championship from Dudley on 6 May episode of Raw to become a four-time champion. Throughout April, Regal would also hold the WWF Hardcore Championship five times, with all of these reigns coming at non-televised house shows. Regal entered the 2002 King of the Ring tournament, but lost to Booker T in the qualifiers.

Regal later lost the European title to Jeff Hardy in July, making Regal the antepenultimate champion as the championship was retired later in the year. He joined The Un-Americans, an anti-American alliance consisting of Canadian wrestlers Lance Storm, Christian and Test on 2 September episode of Raw. At Unforgiven, The Un-Americans lost to Bubba Ray Dudley, Kane and Booker T and Goldust.

On 30 September episode of Raw, every member of The Un-Americans lost their matches, causing the group to separate later in the night and break away into separate groups. Regal began teaming with Lance Storm, Christian formed a tag team with Chris Jericho and Test branched off into single competition. On 30 September episode of Raw, both Christian and Storm lost matches to Randy Orton, while Regal and Test lost to Rob Van Dam and Tommy Dreamer. This led to all four members attacking each other, thus disbanding the team. Storm and Regal won the WWE World Tag Team Championship from Booker T and Goldust thanks to Regal's brass knuckles on 6 January 2003 episode of Raw. They lost the championship to Dudley Boyz at the Royal Rumble on 19 January. but they regained the championship the next night on Raw thanks to an impromptu match set up by Chief Morley after Regal and Storm had put Bubba through a table. At No Way Out on 23 February, Regal and Storm defeated Kane and Rob Van Dam to retain the title in what would be his last match for over a year.

In his 2005 autobiography, Regal recalls having swelling all over his body, high heart rate and trouble sleeping in the lead-up to the match. During the match, he suffered a concussion and was briefly knocked unconscious. Over the next few days, Regal's health worsened and he consulted a doctor. He was informed that he had contracted a heart parasite from a WWE tour of India in November 2002. This, coupled with his aforementioned concussion, kept him out of action for the rest of the year.

Various tag teams (2004–2006) 
Regal returned after a one-year absence on 5 April 2004 episode of Raw. Upon his return, Raw General Manager Eric Bischoff appointed him the guardian of his kayfabe "mentally challenged" nephew Eugene. Regal initially refused, but was demanded to do so in order to be reinstated onto the active roster. Initially annoyed at having to "babysit" Eugene, Regal eventually grew very fond of him and they became friends, becoming a face in the process. On the 10 May episode of Raw, Bischoff told Regal to sabotage Eugene's match so he would quit with embarrassment, in return for Regal being reinstated. Despite reluctantly tripping Eugene, he still managed to defeat his opponent. Regal was eventually reinstated on 21 June episode of Raw, before being put in a match with Kane at Bischoff's behest, which Regal lost after being knocked out by Kane.

In June, Regal was inserted into a feud with Evolution, after the group's leader Triple H tried to convince Eugene that Regal was secretly plotting against him. After weeks of manipulation, Evolution turned on and attacked Eugene on 12 July episode of Raw, much to Regal's dismay. Triple H would then continue to torment Regal and Eugene, and on 9 August episode of Raw, Regal was kidnapped and brutalised by Triple H in order to gain an advantage against Eugene. At SummerSlam, Regal assisted Eugene in his match against Triple H by attacking his manager Ric Flair. However Eugene would still ultimately lose. In September, Regal teamed with Chris Benoit to defeat Evolution members Batista and Ric Flair at Unforgiven. Regal and Eugene won the World Tag Team Championship from La Résistance on 15 November episode of Raw. However, at New Year's Revolution on 9 January 2005, Eugene injured himself during their tag title defence against Christian and Tyson Tomko. Although they successfully retained the titles, Eugene would be out of action for over six months. This ultimately cost them the Tag Team Championship as Regal lost the titles back to La Résistance at a 16 January house show in Winnipeg, Canada, with announcer Jonathan Coachman as Eugene's replacement. On 7 February episode of Raw, Regal teamed with former tag partner Tajiri to reclaim the titles. On the following week's Raw, Regal and Tajiri faced La Résistance in a rematch for the titles, which they won.

During March and April, Regal and Tajiri defended the titles successfully against the likes of La Résistance multiple times, Maven and Simon Dean, The Hurricane and Rosey and The Heart Throbs. This would lead to a tag team turmoil match involving the aforementioned teams at Backlash on 1 May. Regal and Tajiri were eliminated by La Résistance who, in turn, were eliminated by the Hurricane and Rosey, who became the new champions. Regal appeared at ECW One Night Stand as an anti-ECW "crusader" led by Eric Bischoff. At the end of show, Regal and other "crusaders" would engage in a brawl with ECW alumni lead by Stone Cold Steve Austin, in which the crusaders were soundly beaten.

On 30 June, Regal was sent to SmackDown! as part of an eleven-person trade during the draft. His first match on SmackDown! was on 7 July against Matt Morgan in what was to be Morgan's final WWE match. It was interrupted before Regal was even able to enter the ring by Mexicools. His first full match as part of the roster was a loss to Chris Benoit in a catch wrestling match on 16 July episode of Velocity. On 4 August, Regal was scheduled to go one on one with Scotty 2 Hotty, but the Mexicools came in and attacked both men. Two weeks later, they teamed up on SmackDown! against Psicosis and Super Crazy with Juventud in their corner. Halfway through the match, Regal betrayed Scotty by refusing to tag him and walked out of the ring with a smirk on his face, turning heel as a result and allowing the Mexicools to pick up the win. Two days later, Regal cut a promo telling the crowd that he had returned to his former self, referring to himself as a "scoundrel" and a "rogue". The promo ended when Scotty ran to the ring and attacked Regal. The following week, a match between the two was cut short when the debuting Paul Burchill interfered to aid his countryman. Regal went on to take Burchill under his wing and tag with him on the hunt for the WWE Tag Team Championship, but the team's biggest exposure was a loss in a handicap match against Bobby Lashley at Armageddon.

On 3 February 2006 episode of SmackDown!, Regal and Burchill told the "network representative" Palmer Canon that they no longer wanted to be a tag team so they could go their separate ways. During this discussion, Burchill informed Canon that his family heritage traced back to the pirate Blackbeard and that he wanted to turn this into a pirate gimmick. Burchill, with this heroic persona, started a rivalry with former teammate Regal, who tried to convince Burchill to return to his ruthless ways. Regal lost to Burchill in his first match as a pirate. Regal lost a rematch against Burchill, with the match stipulation that Regal would have to dress like a "buxom wench" if he lost. "Lady Regal", as SmackDown announcers jokingly referred to him, had to dress up like this until Burchill lost a match. This ended after Burchill abandoned him during a tag team loss to The Gymini.

King Booker's Court (2006–2007) 

Regal continued to wrestle in a lower mid-card status, the highlight of which saw him facing the United States Champion John "Bradshaw" Layfield in a losing effort while in England. Soon after Booker T became King Booker after becoming King of the Ring, Regal joined King Booker's Court by playing the role of a town crier. As a member of the Court, Regal helped Booker in his feud against Bobby Lashley, occasionally teaming up with fellow Court member Finlay in tag team matches. However, during this time he also feuded with Finlay for the United States Championship. Regal was knighted by King Booker and was given the title of "Sir". At No Mercy, Regal lost to a returning Chris Benoit, resulting in him turning his back on the Court afterwards by knocking down King Booker with a punch to the face after Booker slapped him and called him useless. During the broadcast, Regal was involved in a backstage segment with Vito in which he accidentally exposed his penis.

12 days after No Mercy, Regal stated that while he had once been one of the world's greatest wrestlers, he had since become a doormat for other SmackDown wrestlers. He referred to being dressed as a buxom wench for a pirate, the aforementioned locker room incident with Vito, and being knighted by a false king as examples. After announcing he was finished being a whipping boy, he introduced his old tag team partner Dave Taylor and the two went on to easily defeat the team of Scotty 2 Hotty and Funaki. Though the pair reformed their previous tag team, they did not reuse the Blue Bloods gimmick and instead portrayed themselves as sadistic fighters. However, the team was quickly put into jeopardy in their second match together when Taylor suffered a torn meniscus in his left knee, leaving him injured. Taylor took a more relaxed role for a couple of weeks as a corner man for Regal and only wrestled in a few short house show matches. Taylor quickly healed from his injury and the pair feuded with the WWE Tag Team Champions Paul London and Brian Kendrick. After defeating London and Kendrick on several occasions, at Armageddon they took part in a four-way ladder match alongside Johnny Nitro and Joey Mercury and The Hardys. London and Kendrick coming out on top after Joey Mercury suffered a serious facial injury.

On the 25 May 2007 episode of SmackDown!, Regal and Taylor competed in a number one contenders match for the WWE Tag Team Championship against London and Kendrick, which they lost after Deuce 'n Domino interfered, making both teams the number one contenders. This interference led to a triple threat match the next week on SmackDown! in which Deuce 'n Domino retained the title.

Raw General Manager and King of the Ring (2007–2009) 

On 17 June, Regal was drafted back to the Raw brand during the supplemental draft, ending his tag team with Dave Taylor. On 2 July, Regal served as Interim general manager of Raw, filling in for Jonathan Coachman. While general manager, Regal introduced the Beat the Clock Sprint to Raw, which was used to determine who would challenge John Cena for the WWE Championship at The Great American Bash.

On 6 August episode of Raw, Regal became the new general manager after winning a battle royal featuring other participants from the Raw roster. He began incorporating game shows into Raw while general manager. On 3 September episode of Raw, Regal was attacked by WWE Champion John Cena in retaliation for rewarding Randy Orton with a WWE title shot after Orton had kicked John Cena's father in the head the previous week. Regal was missing from Raw programming for one month due to this attack, making his return by siding with Vince McMahon. On New Year's Eve, Triple H was scheduled to face Ric Flair in which Flair's win or retire ultimatum was still active. Regal announced that if Triple H lost the match in any way, he would not participate in the Royal Rumble match at the 2008 Royal Rumble. This was to give Triple H a reason to want to win the match rather than avoid ending the career of his best friend and idol. Regal was scheduled to compete against Hornswoggle that night with Mr. McMahon at ringside. McMahon tossed Regal some brass knuckles during the match and encouraged him to use them on Hornswoggle, but he let Hornswoggle go and left the ring. During the Flair versus Triple H match, Triple H was about to pin Flair for the win when Regal suddenly punched Flair in the face with the brass knuckles. This gave Flair the win by disqualification, ensuring that he could continue to wrestle and that Triple H would not be part of the Royal Rumble.

As a result of Regal's actions towards Triple H, the following week on Raw Roulette he lost a First Blood match to Triple H after several right hands to Regal's forehead. A few weeks later, Regal made the Raw Elimination Chamber match for No Way Out. He later faced Randy Orton in a match during the European tour to try to teach him some respect. The following week, Regal won the 2008 King of the Ring tournament on a special three-hour Raw, where he defeated Hornswoggle, Finlay and CM Punk all by submission, becoming the first man to make Punk submit. Regal's coronation ceremony the next week was interrupted by the returning Mr. Kennedy. A few weeks later, Regal lost a Loser Gets Fired match to Mr. Kennedy, after which Regal was kayfabe forced to leave WWE. In reality, Regal was suspended on 20 May for sixty days for his second violation of the company's Substance Abuse and Drug Testing Policy. On 28 July, Regal returned from his suspension as a "free agent" during an episode of Raw, where he was defeated by then World Heavyweight Champion CM Punk.

Regal began a mini-feud with Jamie Noble after he took an interest in Noble's romantic interest Layla, prompting him to attack Regal. Both men picked up victories in consecutive weeks, before Regal won their third match, departing with Layla at his side. Regal's feud with Noble escalated the subsequent week when Layla declared that Noble was a loser and that she found a man worthy of her in Regal. However, the feud was short lived.

On 3 November episode of Raw, Regal won an over-the-top battle royal to face Santino Marella for the Intercontinental Championship and the next week in Manchester, Regal defeated Marella in a 40-second squash match to win his second Intercontinental Championship. Later, he entered into a feud for the title with number one contender CM Punk. On 5 January 2009 episode of Raw, Regal lost to Punk via disqualification after he grabbed the referee's shirt. Due to this, Stephanie McMahon awarded Punk a rematch the following week, with the stipulation that if Regal was disqualified, he would lose the Intercontinental title, but this time Punk was disqualified. McMahon awarded Punk another rematch, this time a no disqualification match on 19 January episode of Raw, where Regal lost the title. Regal got a rematch, but lost the match. Following the draft, Regal was left alone on the Raw brand as his on-screen manager Layla was drafted to the SmackDown brand. At Extreme Rules, Regal unsuccessfully challenged Kofi Kingston for the United States Championship along with Montel Vontavious Porter (MVP) and Matt Hardy, Kofi Kingston retained the United States Championship by pinning Regal.

The Ruthless Roundtable (2009–2010) 
Regal was traded to the ECW brand on 29 June. In his first match on ECW on Syfy the following night, he teamed with Vladimir Kozlov to defeat Tommy Dreamer and Christian.

After winning a tag match on 6 August episode of Superstars, Regal was named as the number one contender to the ECW Championship. On 18 August episode of ECW, Regal teamed with Kozlov again to face Ezekiel Jackson and the ECW Champion Christian in which Jackson attacked Christian to ensure Regal's victory, with the trio of Regal, Kozlov and Jackson forming a new alliance which was later dubbed the Ruthless Roundtable. At SummerSlam, Regal challenged Christian for his title, but was defeated in eight seconds. With the Roundtable's help, Regal defeated Christian in a non-title match on 25 August episode of ECW to earn a title rematch against Christian at Breaking Point, but Christian prevailed again with the rest of the Roundtable banned from ringside. Regal was then denied another chance at number one contender-ship, but The Ruthless Roundtable continued to repeatedly attack Christian to continue the feud. As a result, Christian demanded to face Regal, so he received another shot for the ECW Championship on 10 November episode of ECW in Sheffield, England, but he was once again unsuccessful.

At Survivor Series, Regal participated in a traditional five-on-five Survivor Series elimination match and was eliminated by MVP. Following Survivor Series, dissension was teased within The Ruthless Roundtable, although Jackson seemed poised to leave the group, Regal ultimately sided with Jackson and turned on Kozlov by assisting Jackson in defeating Kozlov to qualify for an ECW Homecoming battle royal to determine the number one contender to the ECW Championship. Jackson won the ECW Homecoming battle royal and was granted a title shot, but Christian defeated him at the Royal Rumble to retain his title. Despite the loss, Regal and Jackson continued to assault Christian, who accepted Jackson's title challenge. On the final episode of ECW on 16 February 2010, Regal helped Jackson defeating Christian in an Extreme Rules match to become the final ECW Champion.

Later career (2010–2012) 
After ECW was cancelled to be replaced by NXT, Regal returned to the Raw brand, but he also became the Pro to Rookie Skip Sheffield on the first season of NXT. Regal made his debut on 2 March episode of NXT, teaming with Sheffield in a losing effort against Matt Hardy and Justin Gabriel. On 13 April episode of NXT, Regal won his first match on the show, defeating former pupil Daniel Bryan. On the 10 May episode of NXT, Sheffield was eliminated from the competition.

Regal was mostly involved in lower-card feuds after returning to wrestle on Raw and also regularly appeared on NXT and Superstars. In 2010, he regularly lost tag team matches against Santino Marella while trading wins with Goldust. Regal defeated Darren Young in three matches on Superstars in October and November.

In March 2011, Regal became the color commentator for the fifth season of NXT. On 26 April, Regal was drafted to SmackDown as part of the 2011 WWE supplemental draft. On NXT, Regal began a feud with rookie Jacob Novak after Novak taunted him as old and washed up. On the 3 May episode of NXT, Regal was set to face Novak, but Novak's Pro JTG stepped in to replace Novak. While Regal had the match won, Novak interfered, attacking Regal and causing a disqualification. This attack turned Regal face. On the 10 May episode of NXT, Regal defeated Novak by submission to end the feud as Novak was eliminated on the next episode.

After Regal came to the aid of NXT host Matt Striker, saving him from an assault by Darren Young, Young challenged Regal to a match on 6 September episode of NXT and Regal duly defeated Young. On 13 September episode of NXT, Regal teamed with Striker against JTG and Darren Young in a losing effort. On 10 November episode of Superstars held in England, Regal was pranked when his old "Real Man's Man" theme song was played, then lost to protégé Daniel Bryan, but both wrestlers showed respect after the match. On 15 February 2011 episode of NXT Redemption, Regal temporarily took charge as NXT host from Matt Striker to set up matches on the show, which led to him being made NXT official match coordinator two weeks later. After being appointed as an authority figure, Regal had issues with NXT's perennial troublemakers, Curt Hawkins and Tyler Reks while Maxine attempted to influence him to get her off NXT.

In 2011, Regal also acted as a color commentator for Florida Championship Wrestling (FCW) matches and it was during this time he began a feud with Dean Ambrose after an unprovoked attack by Ambrose on Regal, setting up a match between the two on 6 November episode of FCW, where Regal viciously attacked Ambrose's left arm and pinned Ambrose. Following the loss to Regal, Ambrose became obsessed about wanting a rematch and regularly taunted Regal by using Regal's finishing moves to win matches. A rematch was scheduled as the main event for the final episode of FCW on 15 July. The match began with Regal viciously attacking Ambrose's injured left arm, but Ambrose rammed Regal into the ring post to badly disorientate him. Then Ambrose ruthlessly kneed Regal's head into an exposed turnbuckle, causing Regal to bleed from the ear and the match was then ruled a no contest. After the match, Regal stared down Ambrose, then applauded him and turned his head to allow Ambrose to deliver the Knee Trembler. Afterwards, the FCW locker room stormed the ring to separate Ambrose from a fallen Regal while commentators questioned whether Regal would ever be able to wrestle again. He continued to work as a color commentator for NXT after FCW was rebranded as NXT.

In 2012, Regal wrestled multiple live event dates wrestling against the likes of Santino Marella and Wade Barrett. Regal ended up on both the winning and losing side. At Over the Limit, Regal participated in a 20-man battle royal, but he was ultimately unsuccessful. In late 2012, Regal played the role of Sheamus' friend in Sheamus' rivalry against Big Show, where he was repeatedly attacked by Big Show. Regal was featured on 6 November episode of SmackDown in Birmingham, England in which Regal teamed with Sheamus in a loss to Big Show and Wade Barrett and later on 12 November episode of Raw he lost to Big Show.

Final wrestling matches (2012–2013) 
Regal wrestled for the WWE during the April tour of the United Kingdom losing to Antonio Cesaro on Raw and losing to Wade Barrett on SmackDown. On 1 December, Regal defeated Ace Steel in a match for World League Wrestling in Eldon, Missouri. Regal would later make a surprise appearance on 17 June 2013 episode of Raw where he challenged Cesaro to a match in which he was defeated.

On 5 December, Regal started a feud with his former disciple Kassius Ohno when he saved Tyson Kidd from an assault by Ohno and Leo Kruger. When Regal later saved Derrick Bateman from Ohno's post-match attack, Ohno confronted Regal, who punched Ohno. The next week, Regal apologised to Ohno. In reply, Ohno stated that he had followed in Regal's footsteps to arrive in WWE, but that Regal's whole career had no legacy, leading to Regal punching Ohno again. After both men continued to attack each other, the rivalry culminated in a match on 10 April 2013 episode of NXT, which Regal won. Ohno later apologised to Regal. On 26 June episode of NXT, Regal tried to help Ohno, Adrian Neville and Corey Graves from a joint assault by The Wyatt Family, Garrett Dylan and Scott Dawson, but was overwhelmed. Two weeks later, Graves, Neville and Regal faced The Wyatt Family with Bray Wyatt pinning Regal.

Regal's final in-ring feud was against Antonio Cesaro due to Regal saving Byron Saxton from Cesaro's bullying, which culminated with Cesaro defeating Regal on 25 December episode of NXT. This would be his final match. In 2017, he confirmed that he had retired from wrestling. However, he wrestled Sami Zayn in behind-closed-doors match at a WWE try out in Dubai in 2014.

Work on NXT (2014–2022) 
In July 2014, Regal was given the on-screen role of General Manager of NXT. Dave Meltzer later wrote that Regal was "moved from the commentary booth to the figurehead commissioner role, since the decision was made that NXT should be about grooming announcers for the future in WWE, and they simply don't think of Regal for that role". In both late 2014 and early 2015, WWE executive Triple H described Regal as playing a key role in recruiting wrestlers to NXT and WWE as a whole, whether from the wrestling circuit or from other sports. He also became a trainer at the WWE Performance Center after the passing of Dusty Rhodes. As the on-screen General Manager, Regal made regular appearances on NXT television throughout 2015 and 2016. He appeared during the Cruiserweight Classic semi-finals, handing TJ Perkins his medallion for defeating Kota Ibushi. On 22 January 2018, Regal made a brief appearance on stage during the 25th Anniversary episode of Raw as a former Raw general manager. In February, WWE.com referred to him as the WWE Director of Talent Development and Head of Global Recruiting. Regal was named also the on-screen General Manager of the cruiserweight brand 205 Live on 13 April 2020. Regal was released from his WWE contract on 5 January 2022, ending his 22-year tenure with the company.

All Elite Wrestling (2022) 
At the All Elite Wrestling (AEW) pay-per-view event Revolution in March 2022, Regal made his surprise debut after the match between Jon Moxley (whom he had mentored behind the scenes and once feuded with in-storyline in FCW) and Bryan Danielson (whom he trained). After the event during the media scrum, it was confirmed by AEW President and Chief Executive Officer Tony Khan that Regal had officially signed with the company. He began to work as the manager for Danielson and Moxley's tag team, known as the Blackpool Combat Club, later adding Wheeler Yuta and Claudio Castagnoli to the group. Over the summer, the group would feud with the Jericho Appreciation Society.

At Full Gear, Regal helped MJF defeat Moxley for the AEW World Championship by handing MJF his brass knuckles while the referee was incapacitated. On the 30 November edition of Dynamite, MJF would turn on Regal. Following this, it was reported that Regal was set to leave AEW. His final appearance was a pre-taped segment aired on the 7 December edition of Dynamite. According to Tony Khan, Regal asked to not renew his contract so he could return to WWE and work alongside with his son Bailey, who appears on the NXT brand as Charlie Dempsey and had made his debut in the time while Regal was at AEW. On 30 December Regal confirmed his departure from AEW with a tweet praising his time there.

Second return to WWE (2023−present) 
Regal returned to WWE in January 2023, taking on a non-televised role of Vice President of Global Talent Development with the company.

Professional wrestling style and persona 
Regal's style is a hybrid mix of brawling and submission grappling, often utilising a combination of stiff forearm and knee strikes, along with multiple suplex variations to ground an opponent before locking in any number of brutal submissions. While often claiming to be a typical "English gentleman" and a goodwill ambassador, he frequently broke the rules at any given opportunity; he would choke his opponent while the referee was distracted, attack opponents who were tangled in the ropes, and punch his opponent in the head with knuckle dusters when the referee wasn't looking; the latter became one of his signature finishing moves and was named the Power of the Punch. His other signature moves included the Knee Trembler, a running knee lift to a bent-over opponent's head, the Regal-plex, a bridging leg hook belly-to-back suplex and the Regal Stretch, an arm-trap cross-legged STF.

Personal life 
Matthews married Christina Beddoes in November 1986. They have three sons named Daniel, Bailey, and Dane. Bailey is also a wrestler and debuted on WWE's NXT UK brand under the ring name Charlie Dempsey in 2021.

Matthews' real accent, which greatly differs from the RP accent he primarily used on television, is a mixture of his native Staffordshire accent and a Lancashire accent inspired by his teenage years in Blackpool. He has a tattoo which says "Made in England" on his left leg and a rose with his wife's name on his left arm. His pets include two dogs, three cats, two snakes, eight lizards, and a tortoise; he once quipped that he owns so many pets because "humans disgust [him]".

Matthews participated in a 2001 episode of The Weakest Link, winning two of the first three rounds and eventually finishing third.

In 2003, Matthews was misdiagnosed with what was later found to be a heart defect that was causing the right side of his heart to beat out of sequence with the left, allowing large volumes of fluid to build in his body. After undergoing specialist treatment which involved stopping his heart and months of anti-blood clot treatments, he returned to wrestling in April 2004. During his illness and recovery, he gained and then lost 40 pounds of fat.

Matthews' autobiography, Walking a Golden Mile, was released on 3 May 2005. While in WCW, he was arrested during a flight from Japan to the U.S. when he got drunk and urinated on a stewardess. In his book, he claimed to be so drunk at the time that he could not remember the incident and only remembered waking up in a jail cell in Anchorage, Alaska.

On 30 August 2007, Sports Illustrated named Matthews and nine other athletes as those who were found to have been given steroids not in compliance with the WWE Talent Wellness program. He received stanozolol, somatropin, genotropin, and anastrozole between November 2004 and November 2006.

In December 2022, he stated that his favorite band was Slade and that his favorite song from them was "Far Far Away" from the Slade in Flame album.

Other media 
Matthews has been featured in the WWE video games WWF Road to WrestleMania, WWF SmackDown! Just Bring It, WWE SmackDown! Shut Your Mouth, WWE SmackDown! vs. Raw 2006, SmackDown! vs. RAW 2007, SmackDown! vs. RAW 2008, SmackDown! vs. RAW 2009, SmackDown! vs. RAW 2010, SmackDown! vs. RAW 2011, WWE '12, WWE 2K15, WWE 2K16, and WWE 2K22. In WWE 2K15 and WWE 2K16, both his modern and WCW-era Lord Steven Regal personas were available.

Regal was also featured in WCW vs. nWo: World Tour under his "Steven Regal" ring name.

After joining AEW, Matthews began hosting a podcast titled The Gentleman Villain.

Championships and accomplishments 

 Memphis Championship Wrestling
 MCW Southern Heavyweight Championship (1 time)
 Pro Wrestling Illustrated
 Ranked No. 18 of the top 500 singles wrestlers in the PWI 500 in 1994
 Ranked No. 196 of the top 500 singles wrestlers of the PWI Years in 2003
 World Championship Wrestling
 WCW World Television Championship (4 times)
 World Wrestling Federation/World Wrestling Entertainment
 WWF Hardcore Championship (5 times)
 WWF/WWE European Championship (4 times)
 WWF/WWE Intercontinental Championship (2 times)
 World Tag Team Championship (4 times) – with Lance Storm (2), Eugene (1) and Tajiri (1)
 King of the Ring (2008)
 Wrestling Observer Newsletter
 Best Television Announcer (2013, 2014)

Bibliography 
 Matthews, Darren and Chandler, Neil (2005) Walking a Golden Mile, Pocket Books

Notes

References

External links 

 
 
 
 

1968 births
20th-century professional wrestlers
21st-century professional wrestlers
English expatriate sportspeople in the United States
English male professional wrestlers
English memoirists
English podcasters
Expatriate professional wrestlers
Living people
NWA/WCW World Television Champions
People from Codsall
Professional wrestling announcers
Professional wrestling authority figures
Professional wrestling podcasters
Professional wrestling trainers
Sportspeople from Blackpool
Sportspeople from Staffordshire
WWF European Champions
WWE executives
WWF/WWE Hardcore Champions
WWF/WWE Intercontinental Champions
WWF/WWE King Crown's Champions/King of the Ring winners